Mister Designer is a 1987 Soviet horror film produced and directed by Oleg Teptsov, and based on the short story The Gray Automobile by Alexander Grin.

Plot
Set in St. Petersburg in 1908-1914, famous artist-designer, Platon Andreevich wants to prolong the life of a man by sculpting and drawing, trying to overcome death and improve the world around him with the help of his talent. For many years he does not give rest to the idea of a contest with the Almighty. He, the author of magnificent wax mannequins, wants to create something perfect and eternal, not amenable to the passage of time.

In 1908, the artist receives an order from a jeweler to decorate the shop window. In search of a model for making a mannequin for a showcase, the artist finds Anna, a young girl, fatally ill with consumption, and sculpts his best mannequin from her, putting his whole soul into work. Some time passes and the year 1914 is about to arrive. The well-known artist has fallen into oblivion, things are not going so well as in the old days. Due to creative crisis, the artist begins to abuse morphine, he is threatened with complete ruin.

In extreme need, Platon Andreevich accepts the offer of a certain rich businessman by the name of Grillo to decorate the interior of his house. Acquaintance with Maria, wife of the master, leads the artist into confusion. He is convinced that a few years ago it was from her, when she bore the name Anna Beletskaya, he molded his best wax mannequin. But Maria tells him that she has never seen an artist before, and knows nothing about Anna. After all attempts to retrieve the truth, she only tells the designer to forget about Anna.

Platon Andreevich proposes to the girl, but receives a refusal: Maria tells him that he is too poor. Thanks to an incredible chance, the designer wins a huge fortune from Maria's husband and makes his offer again, and again receives a refusal. She wouldn't stay with the madman who keeps calling her by another woman's name. The designer seeks to prove Maria is Anna, but he only finds the proof to the opposite. He finds Anna's tomb in a graveyard. In his workshop, he finds Anna's mummy that he believed was a mannequin. He starts to believe that Maria is his sculpture that became alive. (The film never explicitly says whether it is a delusion or reality).

Gradually losing grasp of reality, Platon goes to Grillo's house only to find Grillo dead. His widow reconsidered Platon's proposal and is ready to marry him now. However, Platon accuses her of being a "doll" that took the place of a real person, and assault her with burning log. One of Maria's friends shoots him and then runs him over with his car.

Cast
Viktor Avilov (debut in the movie) - Platon Andreevich
Anna Demyanenko - Anna / Maria
Mikhail Kozakov - Grillo (in the story of A. Greene - Grigno)
Ivan I. Krasko - servant
Vadim Lobanov - jeweler
Valentina Malakhieva - the old woman
Konstantin Lukashov - cemetery watchman
Svetlana Panfilova - nun
Yuri Aroyan - second cemetery watchman
Vladimir Minyailo - officer
Azamat Bagirov - card player
Yuri Bashkov - croupier

Reception

Awards
The film won the Nika Award for Best Costume Design by Larisa Konnikova.

References

External links

1987 films
1987 drama films
1987 horror films
Lenfilm films
Mannequins in films
1980s horror drama films
Soviet horror drama films
Surrealist films
Soviet horror films
Magic realism films